Louis Graydon Sullivan (June 16, 1951 – March 2, 1991) was an American author and activist known for his work on behalf of trans men. He was perhaps the first transgender man to publicly identify as gay, and is largely responsible for the modern understanding of sexual orientation and gender identity as distinct, unrelated concepts.

Sullivan was a pioneer of the grassroots female-to-male (FTM) movement and was instrumental in helping individuals obtain peer-support, counselling, endocrinological services and reconstructive surgery outside of gender dysphoria clinics. He founded FTM International, one of the first organizations specifically for FTM individuals, and his activism and community work was a significant contributor to the rapid growth of the FTM community during the late 1980s.

Early life
Sullivan grew up in Milwaukee, Wisconsin. Sullivan was born the third child of six in a very religious Catholic family and attended Catholic primary and secondary school. Sullivan started keeping a journal at the age of 10, describing his early childhood thoughts of being a boy, confusing adolescence, sexual fantasies of being a gay man, and his involvement in the Milwaukee music scene. During his adolescence he expressed continued confusion about his identity, writing at age 15 in 1966 that "I want to look like what I am but don't know what some one like me looks like. I mean, when people look at me I want them to think— there's one of those people […] that has their own interpretation of happiness. That's what I am."

Sullivan was attracted to the idea of playing different gender roles,  and his attraction for male roles was outlined in his writings, specifically in his short stories, poems and diaries; he often explored the ideas of male homosexuality and gender identity. At the age of seventeen he began a relationship with a self-described "feminine" male lover, and together they would play with gender roles and gender-bending.

Transition and adulthood
In 1973, Sullivan identified himself as a "female transvestite" and by 1975 he identified himself as a "female-to-male transsexual". In 1975, it "became apparent" that Sullivan needed to leave Milwaukee for somewhere where he could find "more understanding" and access hormones for his transition, so he decided to move to San Francisco. His family was supportive of the move and gave him "a handsome man's suit and [his] grandfather's pocket watch" as going-away presents.

Upon arrival in San Francisco, Sullivan began working at the Wilson Sporting Good Company, where he was employed as a woman but cross dressed as a man much of the time. In his personal life, Sullivan lived as an out gay man, but he was repeatedly denied sex reassignment surgery (SRS) because of his sexual orientation and the expectation of the time that transgender people should adopt stereotypical heterosexual opposite-sex gender roles. This rejection led Sullivan to start a campaign to remove homosexuality from the list of contraindications for SRS.

In 1976, Sullivan suffered a severe crisis of gender identity and continued living as a feminine heterosexual woman for the next three years.  In 1978 he was shaken by the death of his youngest brother. In 1979, Sullivan was finally able to find doctors and therapists who would accept his sexuality and began taking testosterone, with double mastectomy surgery following a year later. He then left his previous job to work as an engineering technician at the Atlantic-Ritchfield Company so that he could fully embrace his new identity as a man with new co-workers.

In 1986, Sullivan obtained genital reconstruction surgery. He was diagnosed as HIV positive shortly after his surgery, and told he only had 10 months to live. It is likely that Sullivan was HIV- infected in 1980, just after his chest surgery. He wrote, "I took a certain pleasure in informing the gender clinic that even though their program told me I could not live as a Gay man, it looks like I'm going to die like one." Sullivan died of AIDS-related complications on March 2, 1991.

Sullivan kept a journal throughout his life: selected excerpts were released in 2019 as We Both Laughed in Pleasure.

Activism and community contributions
Sullivan wrote the FTM Newsletter, one of the first guidebooks for trans men, and also a biography of the San Francisco FTM Jack Bee Garland. Sullivan was instrumental in demonstrating the existence of trans men who were themselves attracted to men. Lou Sullivan began peer counselling through the Janus Information Facility which was an organization that provided transgender issues. He is also credited for being the first to discuss the eroticism of men's clothing.

Editor of The Gateway
Sullivan was active in the Golden Gate Girls/Guys organization (later called the Gateway Gender Alliance), one of the first social/educational organizations for transgender people that offered support to FTM transsexuals, and in fact successfully petitioned to add "Guys" to its name. From July 1979 to October 1980, Sullivan edited The Gateway, a newsletter with "news and information on transvestism and transsexualism" that was circulated by the Golden Gate Girls/Guys. It was originally primarily focused on the needs of MTF and transvestite readers and read "much like a small town newspaper", but under Sullivan's editing it gained more gender parity between MTF and FTM issues. According to Megan Rohrer, Sullivan "transform[ed] Gateway in a way that [would] forever change FTM mentoring" because trans people could still obtain information on how to pass without having to attend group gatherings in person.

GLBT Historical Society
Sullivan was a founding member and board member of the GLBT Historical Society (formerly the Gay and Lesbian Historical Society) in San Francisco. His personal and activist papers are preserved in the institution's archives as collection no. 1991–07; the papers are fully processed and available for use by researchers, and a finding aid is posted on the Online Archive of California. The Historical Society has displayed selected materials from Sullivan's papers in a number of exhibitions, notably "Man-i-fest: FTM Mentoring in San Francisco from 1976 to 2009," which was open through much of 2010 in the second gallery at the society's headquarters at 657 Mission St. in San Francisco, and "Our Vast Queer Past: Celebrating San Francsico's GLBT History," the debut exhibition in the main gallery at the society's GLBT History Museum that opened in January 2011 in San Francisco's Castro District.

Lobbying for recognition of gay trans men

Sullivan lobbied the American Psychiatric Association and the World Professional Association for Transgender Health for them to recognize his existence as a gay trans man. He was determined to change people's attitudes towards trans gay men but also to change the medical process of transition by removing sexual orientation from the criteria of gender identity disorder so that trans men who are gay could also access hormones and surgery, essentially making the process "orientation blind".

Honors 
In June 2019, Sullivan was one of the inaugural fifty American "pioneers, trailblazers, and heroes" inducted on the National LGBTQ Wall of Honor within the Stonewall National Monument (SNM) in New York City's Stonewall Inn. The SNM is the first U.S. national monument dedicated to LGBTQ rights and history, and the wall's unveiling was timed to take place during the 50th anniversary of the Stonewall riots.

In August 2019, Sullivan was one of the honorees inducted in the Rainbow Honor Walk, a walk of fame in San Francisco's Castro neighborhood noting LGBTQ people who have "made significant contributions in their fields".

Works
 "A Transvestite Answers a Feminist" in Gay People's Union News (1973)
 "Looking Towards Transvestite Liberation" in Gay People's Union News (1974)
 Female to Male Cross Dresser and Transsexual (1980)
 Information for the Female to Male Cross Dresser and Transsexual (1990)
 From Female To Male: The Life of Jack Bee Garland (1990)
 We Both Laughed in Pleasure: The Selected Diaries of Lou Sullivan 1961-1991. (2019). Edited by Ellis Martin and Zach Ozma

References

External links
Guide to the Louis Graydon Sullivan Papers, 1755–1991, giving an overview of the GLBT Historical Society's collection of Sullivan's papers, photographs, diaries, short stories, poems, essays, and correspondence
Man-i-fest: FTM Mentorship in San Francisco from 1976–2009, an overview of an exhibit by the GLBT Historical Society on the letters and work of Lou Sullivan
 Biography of Lou Sullivan at A Gender Variance Who's Who
 A special edition of FTM Newsletter celebrating and remembering Lou Sullivan
 "Uncle Lou", an article on Daily Kos written by one of Sullivan's relatives for the 20th anniversary of his death
 The Lou Sullivan Society
Lou Sullivan Collection on Digital Transgender Archive
The Life of Lou Project, a digital project dedicated to Lou's writings and achievements

Further reading
 Smith, Brice (2017). Lou Sullivan: Daring to be a Man Among Men. Transgress Press. 
 Martin, Ellis and Ozma, Zach (editors) (2019). We Both Laughed in Pleasure: The Selected Diaries of Lou Sullivan 1961--1991. Nightboat Books. 

1951 births
1991 deaths
AIDS-related deaths in California
American gay writers
American LGBT rights activists
LGBT people from Wisconsin
Writers from Milwaukee
Transgender men
20th-century American LGBT people
Transgender rights activists
American transgender writers